Songkalia or Songkaria may refer to:
Songkalia River, a river in Western Thailand
Ban Songkalia (also known as Songkurai after the Japanese POW camp situated there during World War II), a village on the river